Vivek Sharma is an Indian filmmaker. He became recognised for his work when Amitabh Bachchan himself agreed to work with his directorial debut Bhoothnath.

Early life 

Vivek Sharma was born in a Brahmin family in Jabalpur , Madhya Pradesh. 
He completed his Master Of Science in Physics and topped the Computer Branch. 
His inclination towards Cinema and writing was inborn and he aspired to become a filmmaker.

Career 

In 1992 Vivek Sharma shifted to his dream city Mumbai and joined Mr.Mahesh Bhatt as assistant director. He continued working with him for long six years and did manny big films like Hum Hain Rahi Pyar Ke , Naajayaz, Chaahat (1996 film), Duplicate (1998 film) , Angaaray (1998 film) etc.
He became close to Shah Rukh Khan and Juhi Chawla and eventually joined their company Dreamz Unlimited which produced manny hit films like Phir Bhi Dil Hai Hindustani, Aśoka (film), Chalte Chalte (2003 film) etc
Vivek Sharma's good command over languages specially Hindi became a big help for actors and he became integral part of their journey. 
In a very short span of time he became part of 25 films. Directed Manny ads. Launch ad for Santro car was his big achievement as it was produced by his own banner Filmzone Creations LLP known as Filmzone.
In year 2008 Vivek Sharma turned independent filmmaker with one the biggest block buster Bhoothnath which was a very Big cast film ( Amitabh Bachchan, Juhi Chawla and Shahrukh Khan).
In Kal Kissne Dekha he launched many new faces Like Jackky Bhagnani, Nushrat Bharucha and Vaishali Desai. 
His latest romantic comedy A Game Called Relationship marked his acting debut also.

Filmography

Music videos

References

External links
 
 
 

Living people
Hindi-language film directors
21st-century Indian film directors
1969 births